The 2002 Canadian Football League Expansion Draft was a three-round CFL draft that took place on January 17, 2002 which assigned players from existing CFL teams to the expansion Ottawa Renegades. Ottawa could select one import player from each team and two non-import players. Alternatively, the Renegades could select a team's second-round draft pick in the 2002 or 2003 CFL Drafts in place of one of the non-import players. Additionally, member teams were permitted to protect two quarterbacks in the draft, limiting Ottawa's selections. Ottawa selected six quarterbacks from teams' negotiation lists and, as such,  their names were not released.

Round one

Round two

Round three

References 

Canadian College Draft
2002 in Canadian football